"The Bounty Hunter" is an episode in the Australian/British science fiction drama television series K-9. It is the fourth episode of Series 1.

Synopsis
K-9's past comes back to haunt him, when an alien Bounty Hunter arrives and accuses him of committing a murder in the 501st century.

Plot
Gryffen is at work trying to fix K-9s memory but with no success, Starkey offers to take K-9 for a walk. They go and see a Ferris Wheel which starts to accelerate in speed rapidly and a group of CCPCs walk in, meanwhile at the mansion as Gryffen instructs them to leave someone comes through the STM. The CCPC's keep the worried crowd under control, Drake informs them of a dissident attack. A bomb has been strapped to the wheel, if they attempt to stop or slow down the wheel it will detonate. Starkey questions to K-9 why the Department aren't trying to help as more news cameras come in. Back at the mansion, the unknown person who came through the STM tells Gryffen he came looking for K-9.

K-9 and Starkey find the Bomb which is strangely non-explosive, they realise that this was a publicity stunt planned by the department. K-9 destroys it which slows the Wheel down, saving the people on it. Starkey and K-9 are praised by the crowd, to Drake's dismay, they then quickly leave. Back at the mansion the unknown person who reveals his name as Ahab (played by Brad McMurray) grows impatient and demands to know where K-9 is, claiming he has committed murder. When Gryffen refuses to tell him where K-9 is infuriating Ahab even further he is interrupted by a department broadcast from Drake claiming that the "Mechanical Dog" was not the hero of the Ferris Wheel incident. Ahab decides to go the department to help him find K-9 and announces his presence via a CCTC device.

At Department HQ June and Drake argue about K-9's presence, Drake claims he is a security threat but June persists that K-9 could be of value. Drake asks his boss about K-9, he informs Drake he shall consider K-9 but orders Drake and June to keep doing their separate duties in the meantime. Darius takes Jorjie, Starkey and K-9 to his secret storage facility in the sewers. Gryffen informs June of his encounter with Ahab who asks Drake to assist him in tracking K-9. As Starkey, Darius and Jorjie sleep in the storage facility, K-9 accesses the remains of his memory and encounter with Zanthus Pia (the man who Ahab claims K-9 murdered). The clip shows K-9's HUD stating Zanthus must be destroyed, the clip then glitches and cuts to a burning corpse which K-9 identifies as Zanthus's remains. He decides he is "Guilty".

K-9 decides to surrender himself to the department. Starkey and the others try to stop him but K-9 is captured by Ahab and they all go to the mansion. The leash like device Ahab uses on K-9 turns him into a conductor, restoring some of his memory of Zanthus Pia. It turns out that K-9 did not kill him, he was, in fact, killed by Ahab. When K-9 reveals that the device Ahab uses generates extreme cold which weakens him, Jorjie throws a cup of tea on the beam disabling it. The force of the device throws Ahab into the STM and he disappears. June appears and says K-9 is under Department control, specifically her section and gives Gryffen full responsibility of him.

Continuity
Gryffen suggests that the Jixen in league with Ahab was the same one which followed K-9 in Regeneration.
In a news report, it is stated a man named only "Mr Smith of unknown origin" has won the lottery and it asks anyone who he is. "Mr Smith" could possibly be The Doctor as he often goes by the alias of "John Smith". The fact that this "John Smith" won the lottery maybe an allusion to the Doctor Who episode "School Reunion" in which the Doctor using the John Smith name became a teacher at a school a job which he got after placing a winning lottery ticket in the mailbox of his predecessor. "School Reunion" was K-9's return appearance to Doctor Who since its revival in 2005.  The Doctor also used time-travel to win a lottery as a wedding present for former companion Donna Noble in "The End of Time".

Story notes
The other news at the bottom notes the first flight of the NX-2000 (USS Excelsior of Star Trek).
The same broadcast also mentions a self-aware oven known as THX1138, a reference to the movie of the same name.

External links 
 
 K9 Official
 The Doctor Who Site

K-9 (TV series) episodes
2010 British television episodes
Television episodes about publicity stunts